Siman may refer to:
Siman, Kermanshah
Siman, Razavi Khorasan
Si Siman, entertainment executive
Scott Siman, entertainment executive, son of Si Siman

See also
Semaan
SIMAN